The following lists events that happened during 2021 in Niue.

Incumbents 
 Monarch: Elizabeth II
 Premier – Dalton Tagelagi
 Speaker of the Assembly – Hima Douglas (from 11 June)

Events 
Ongoing – COVID-19 pandemic in Oceania

Deaths 
 9 July – Frank Lui, politician, premier of Niue (1993–1993) (born 1935)

References 

 
2020s in Niue
Years of the 21st century in Niue
Niue